Basil Hadley (1940 in London, England – 2006 in Stepney, Adelaide) was an English Australian printmaker and painter. His works are represented in National and State public galleries around Australia and in various private collections.

Biography 

Basil Hadley studied at the Ealing College of Art in London. He came to Australia in 1965 and studied printmaking at the Prahran College of Advanced Education, Melbourne.

From 1975 until his death in October 2006, he resided in Stepney, Adelaide, South Australia with his wife Tanya who died a few months prior to Hadley.

The estate of the late Basil Hadley, including paintings, graphics and book collection were auctioned by Elder Fine Art, North Adelaide in 2007.

Techniques 

Hadley was known well known for exploring various styles and techniques such as:

 humor
 abstract
 Australian landscape
 birds
 cats

Exhibitions 

One-man shows included: Max Adams Gallery, Adelaide 1971; Toorak Gallery Melbourne, 1971, 1972, 1974, 1976; Macquarie Gallery, Canberra 1972-74; Desborough Gallery, Perth 1973; Lister Gallery, Perth 1975, 1978; Fremantle Arts Centre 1975; Anne Simons Gallery, Canberra 1976; Osborne Art Gallery, Adelaide 1976; Salamanca Place Gallery, Hobart 1977; Bonython Gallery, Adelaide 1978.

Group shows included: Henri Worland Memorial Prize, Warrnambool, Victoria 1974; 'Australian and New Zealand Printmakers', New Zealand 1975.

Awards 

 1973 Inez Hutchinson Prize, Victoria
 1974 Bunbury Purchase Prize, Western Australia
 1974 David Jones Prize, Western Australia
 1975 Albany Prize, Western Australia
 1976 R.M. Ansett-Hamilton Award, Victoria
 1976 Print Council of Australian Members Print Commission
 1977 Gold Coast City Art Prize, Queensland
 1977 Kernewek Lowender Art Prize, South Australia
 1979 Joint winner of the Fremantle Print Award
 1981 Broken Hill Art Prize, NSW
 1984 Nominated for BHP Award for the Pursuit of Excellence
 1985 Barossa Valley Vintage Festival Art Prize, SA
 1987 Painting Section of the 19th Alice Prize, NT
 1989 Kernewek Lowender Art Prize, Foundation South Australia Art Award

Represented 

Basil Hadley's works have been represented at: Gold Coast Civic Art Collection, Queensland; Queensland Art Gallery; Alice Springs Art Foundation, NT; Rabaul Art Gallery, Papua New Guinea; WA Art Gallery; University of WA; La Trobe University, Vic; Reserve Bank of Australia Collection, NSW; Dunedin Public Art Gallery, NZ; Sydney College of the Arts, NSW; Joshua McClelland Gallery, Vic; Townsville Art Gallery, Qld; Hamilton Regional Gallery, Vic.; Castlemaine Art Museum, Vic; Canberra and Tas Colleges of Advanced Education; Print Council of Australia Collection; Melbourne Metropolitan Board of Works Collection, Vic; Australian Wheat Board, Vic; Bunbury Art Gallery, WA; Fremantle Art Centre, WA; Devonport Gallery and Art Centre, Tas; Albany Town Council Collection, WA; Graylands Teachers College, WA; Claremont Teachers College, WA; Private collections in France, USA, Australia and UK, including BHP Co Ltd.

Notes and references

Bibliography 

  Basil Hadley, by David Dolan (1991)

External links 
 Trials and tribulation, The Advertiser (2007)
 Basil Hadley works sold at auction
 Design Art Australia online-Basil Hadley

1940 births
2006 deaths
People from Ealing
English emigrants to Australia
Artists from Adelaide
Australian printmakers
20th-century Australian painters
20th-century Australian male artists
20th-century printmakers
Print Council of Australia
Painters from London
Australian male painters